Henriette Koulla (born ) is a Cameroonian volleyball player. She is a member of the Cameroon women's national volleyball team and played for INJS Yaoundé in 2014. She was part of the Cameroonian national team at the 2014 FIVB Volleyball Women's World Championship in Italy. and 2018 FIVB Volleyball Women's World Championship.

Clubs
  INJS Yaoundé (2014)
 ŽOK Gacko 2017/18

References

1992 births
Living people
Cameroonian women's volleyball players
Place of birth missing (living people)
Olympic volleyball players of Cameroon
Volleyball players at the 2016 Summer Olympics
Setters (volleyball)
21st-century Cameroonian women